Percy Dawson may refer to:

 Percy Dawson (baseball), American baseballer
 Percy Dawson (footballer) (1890–1974),  English footballer with Hearts and Blackburn
 Percy Dawson (lawyer) (1865–1916), Australian lawyer